Ivonka Survilla (born Ivonka Šymaniec, April 11, 1936) is the President of the Rada of the Belarusian Democratic Republic, a Belarusian government in exile.

Early life
Ivonka Survilla was born in Stoŭbcy, then part of the Second Polish Republic (West Belarus), into the family of Uladzimier Šymaniec, an engineer, and Evelina Šymaniec née Paškievič.

In 1940, after the Soviet annexation of West Belarus, Uladzimier Šymaniec was arrested by the Soviets and sentenced to five years imprisonment in Gulag. He escaped due to the German attack on the USSR.

In 1944 the family fled to the West through East Prussia with the thousands of other refugees and eventually reached Denmark where they lived in a refugee camp for several years. On the way Ivonka's younger sister died.

In 1948 her family moved to France and settled in Paris. Survilla's family members were active participants in the life of the local Belarusian community. Ivonka Šymaniec has studied at École nationale supérieure des Beaux-Arts and then graduated from a humanities faculty of the Sorbonne.

In 1959 Ivonka Šymaniec married Janka Survilla, a Belarusian economist, activist and radio broadcaster. With him she moved to Madrid where they ran a Belarusian language radio program supported by Francoist Spain.

In Canada

After closure of the radio station in 1965, Janka and Ivonka Survilla moved to Canada in 1969 where Ivonka started working as translator for the federal government. She eventually became the head of Translation Services at Health Canada.

In Canada Ivonka Survilla became an active member local Belarusian organisations.

In 1989, Ivonka Survilla, with the assistance of her husband Janka Survilla and friends Zinaida Gimpelevitch and Pauline Paszkievicz-Smith, created the Canadian Relief Fund for Chernobyl Victims in Belarus. This charitable organization provides medical aid in various forms, reciprocal medical staff visits between Canada and Belarus, food aid as well as providing health respites for children in various locations within Canada.

As President of the Rada of the Belarusian Democratic Republic

Ivonka Survilla was elected president of the Rada of the Belarusian Democratic Republic in 1997. She is the first woman president of the Rada and the first president elected after the dissolution of the Soviet Union and creation of an independent Republic of Belarus.

Survilla regularly addresses the Belarusian society on March 25 and other occasions.

She is a founding signatory of the Prague Declaration on European Conscience and Communism.

In 2013 she was awarded the Canadian Queen Elizabeth II Diamond Jubilee Medal for "her lifelong work in restoring democracy to Belarus".

Personal life
Ivonka Survilla has two daughters. One of her daughters, Maria Paula Survilla, (1964–2020) was a professor of ethnomusicology at Wartburg College in Waverly, Iowa. Her husband Janka Survilla died in Ottawa in 1997.

Survilla has participated in more than 30 exhibitions as a painter.

References

External links 
 Official page on Rada of the Belarusian Democratic Republic website
 Ivonka Survilla answers questions 

1936 births
Living people
People from Stowbtsy
People from Nowogródek Voivodeship (1919–1939)
Members of the Rada of the Belarusian Democratic Republic
Belarusian emigrants to Canada
20th-century Belarusian women politicians
20th-century Belarusian politicians
Belarusian anti-communists
Belarusian emigrants to France
University of Paris alumni
Politicians from Ottawa
21st-century Belarusian women politicians
21st-century Belarusian politicians
Heads of government in exile